The 1981 Lacoste Cup, also known as the Cologne Cup, was a men's tennis tournament played on indoor carpet courts at the Sporthalle in Cologne, West Germany that was part of the 1981 Volvo Grand Prix circuit. It was the sixth edition of the tournament and was held from 26 October through 1 November 1981. First-seeded Ivan Lendl won the singles title.

Finals

Singles
 Ivan Lendl defeated  Sandy Mayer 6–3, 6–3
 It was Lendl's 8th singles title of the year and the 15th of his career.

Doubles
 Sandy Mayer /  Frew McMillan defeated  Jan Kodeš /  Karl Meiler 6–0, 6–4

References

External links
 ITF – tournament edition details

Cologne Cup
Cologne Cup